Dharakote is a semi-urban village and former princely state in Dharakote Block of Ganjam district in the Indian state of Odisha.

Geography
NH-59 (Gopalpur-Khariar) passes through this town. It is located about 12 km north-west from Asika and 55 km from Silk City Brahmapur.

Administratively it consisted of three subdivisions: Jahada with 85 villages, Kunanogada with 37 villages and Sahasrango with 66 villages.

Villages of Dharakote
 Kanagiridi
 Panibandha
 Baharpur (12 km)
 Balarampur
 Baradabili (12 km)
 Arjuna palli
 Kahira palli
 Dharakote
 Dhaugam
 Golla Damodarpalli
 Jaga Mohan (2.4 km)
 Dasamaili
 Haripur
 Bethuar
 Dakabaja
 Jahada (4.4 km)
 Jhadabandha
 Jharapari
 Machhakot
 Manikapur (27 km)
 Mundamarai (3 km)
 Rugumu (8 km)
 Saradhapur(5.5 km)
 Singipur
 Pratapur (7 km)

Tourist destinations
The Jagannath Temple and Dharakote Maharaja Palace are famous tourist destinations here.

Jagannath Temple

Dharakote is famous for Sri Jagannath Temple. The Jagannath Temple, Dharakote looks similar to Puri Temple. Ekadasi Cart festival is famous among people. Around 40k-70k people visit this festival.

Dharakote Maharaja Palace
This is a 600-year-old palace of the King of Dharakote. The palace is situated just beside the Jagannath Temple.

Rani Sulakshana Geetanjali Devi is the present Rani Saheb of Dharakote since 28 May 2010.

List of Rajas

Rajas of Khidisingi
 Bera Patta Mallik (Last Kandha king)
 Raja Sobha Chandra Singh (Nala dynasty descendant)
 Raja Purusottama Singh
 Raja Krushna Singh
 Raja Rai Singh
 Raja Preeti Singh
 Raja Kirti Singh
 Raja Padmanabha Singh
 Raja Bikram Singh
 Raja Baliar Singh (Last Khidisingi king)

In 1476, Raja Baliar Singh divided the Khidisingi (Sorada) kingdom into four different states due to early demise of his elder son. Dharakote went to his third son, Raja Hadu Singh.

 Badagada – Raja Daman Singh (Baliar Singh's grandson from his eldest son)
 Sorada – Raja Sandhadhanu Singh (also known as Abhaya Pratap)
 Dharakote – Raja Hadu Singh
 Sheragada – Raja Parsuram Singh (Minor) (Represented by Baliar himself).

Rajas of Dharakote Estate
 Raja HADU SINGH (1477-1540)
 Raja RAI SINGH (1540-1602)
 Raja NARAYAN SINGH (1602-1647)
 Raja PURUSHOTTAM SINGH (1647-1699)
 Raja RAM CHANDRA SINGH (1699-1731)
 Raja JAI SINGH (1731-1748)
 Raja RAJENDRA SINGH (1748-1780)
 Raja DAMODAR SINGH 1780
 Raja KRUSHNA SINGH (1780-1788)
 Raja JAGANATH SINGH (1788-1830)
 Raja RAGHUNATH SINGH (1830-1863)
 Raja BRAJA SUNDAR SINGH (1863-1880)
 Raja MADAN MOHAN SINGH DEO (1880-1937)
 Raja BRAJKISHORE SINGH DEO (1937-1938)
 Raja KRUSHNA CHANDRA SINGH DEO (1938-1946)
 Raja PADMANABH SINGH DEO (1946-1949)
 Raja ANANT NARAYAN SINGH DEO (1974-2003)
 Raja KISHORE CHANDRA SINGH DEO (2003-2010)
 Rani SULAKSHANA GEETANJALI DEVI (2010- current titular ruler)

Sati Chita (Sati's Pyre)
It is said that, Raja Jaganath Singh (1788-1830) while returning to his Palace after a hunt, saw a ray of light coming from inside a hut. The Raja entered the hut and saw a holy man meditating in front of a fire. The Holy man told the Raja that this was the  place where Rani Chandama Devi had committed Sati. The Raja was impressed and immediately ordered the construction of a Math over that place, and later descendants of the Dharakote Royal family have kept the flame burning ever since, with the task of keeping the flame alive being entrusted to the Head Priests of the Math. The fire, known popularly as Sati Chita (Sati's Pyre) is tended to by a Mahant (Head Priest) at Sathi Math which is built on 9 acres of land at the entrance of Dharakote fort.

Educational Institutions
 Ananta Narayan Higher Secondary School
 Sri Raja's High School
 Krushna Singh Girl's High School
 Badadanda Sahi Primary School
 Block Colony Primary School
 Ex-Board Boy's Primary School
 Sri Brajeswari Girl's Primary School
 Kotharisahi Primary School
 Majhisahi Primary School
 Ghodapalli Primary School
 Pattadev Sanskrit Toll
 Saraswati Bidyabhaban School

Banks in Dharakote 
 State Bank of India
 Utkal Gramya Bank
 Aska Co-op Central Bank

References

External links
 Girl sweeps aside patriarchal rite
 DHARAKOTE (Zamindari)

Cities and towns in Ganjam district